Buzz!: The Ultimate Music Quiz is a party video game developed by Relentless Software and published by Sony Computer Entertainment. It was released in 2010 for the PlayStation 3 and 2011 for the PlayStation Portable. An installment of the Buzz! game series, it was only released in Europe.

Gameplay
The Ultimate Music Quiz is the first Buzz! game to feature support for PlayStation Move. The move section of the game allows users to take part in a different style of quiz where they use the Move controller to select the correct answer. During this section the player is shown on screen and the Move controller is shown as a giant dart or a hammer or other object which the user uses to pop balloons or break block that represent the correct answer.

Four players can participate at a time, with a choice of game lengths or specific rounds to be played. There is a new mini-game named Twisted Tunes. It makes slight changes to each song given, with a goal to guess them as fast as possible.

The game also includes a feature called Paperface where players with a PlayStation Eye camera can use it to add their own faces, for use on the in-game characters.

References

External links 
Developer Relentless Software website

Buzz!
2010 video games
PlayStation 3 games
PlayStation Move-compatible games
PlayStation Portable games
EyeToy games
Sony Interactive Entertainment games
Video games developed in the United Kingdom
Europe-exclusive video games
Relentless Software games
Multiplayer and single-player video games